Yeovil District Hospital NHS Foundation Trust runs Yeovil District Hospital in Yeovil, Somerset, England. It provides acute care for a population of about 180,000, people living in South Somerset, North and West Dorset, and parts of Mendip. The hospital admits around 30,000 inpatients or day cases each year and treats more than 90,000 people in the outpatient appointments. Approximately 40,000 people are treated in Accident and Emergency and 1,300 babies are born in the maternity unit each year.

Performance

Developments
The trust set up a joint venture, Southwest Pathology Services, with Taunton and Somerset NHS Foundation Trust and Integrated Pathology Partnerships in 2012.  All routine pathology, apart from histopathology, is now performed at a separate site which also handles GP tests. Essential service laboratories are established in the hospitals for urgent tests. Turnround times for both GP and hospital tests has improved and costs have been reduced.

In December 2014, the trust established a 15-year strategic estate partnership to fund and manage a new health campus with construction companies Interserve and Prime. The £70million deal will enable the trust to expand the number of beds for patients with dementia, create a GP practice, a nursing home and a retail pharmacy and to relocate its day surgery service onto the campus.

It started a 12-month trial with the Babylon Health app for staff of the trust in December 2016.

South Somerset Symphony programme
It set up a subsidiary company called Symphony Healthcare Services in 2016, which took over the running of three small GP practices with a combined registered list of 12,500 in March 2016. Symphony is also forming a partnership with South Somerset Primary Healthcare which will become an accountable care organisation managing an outcomes based budget for the 120,000 population of South Somerset. The programme was reported to have reduced emergency hospital admissions by 30% by focusing intensive support on the 4% of patients with most complex needs.
It took over Highbridge Medical Centre, in Highbridge in April 2017.  It plans to take on eight more GP practices covering a population of around 61,000 during 2018.

In 2017, the trust established a subsidiary company, Simply Serve, to which 360 estates and facilities staff were transferred. The intention was to achieve VAT benefits, as well as pay bill savings, by recruiting new staff on less expensive non-NHS contracts. VAT benefits arise because NHS trusts can only claim VAT back on a small subset of goods and services they buy. The Value Added Tax Act 1994 provides a mechanism through which NHS trusts can qualify for refunds on contracted out services.

Merger
In November 2020 it was reported to be planning a merger with Somerset NHS Foundation Trust, which would create England’s first provider of primary, acute, community and mental health care services.

See also
 Healthcare in Somerset
 List of hospitals in England
 List of NHS trusts

References

Yeovil
South Somerset
NHS foundation trusts
Health in Somerset